Leah Maree Purcell  (born 14 August 1970) is an Aboriginal Australian stage and film actress, playwright, film director, and novelist. She made her film debut in 1999, appearing in Paul Fenech's Somewhere in the Darkness, which led to roles in films, such as, Lantana (2001), Somersault (2004), The Proposition (2005) and Jindabyne (2006). 

In 2014, Purcell wrote and starred in the play, The Drover's Wife, based on the original story by Henry Lawson. In 2019, she went on to write the bestselling novel, The Drover's Wife: The Legend of Molly Johnson, which was adapted for the screen when Purcell made her directorial debut in the acclaimed film of the same name in 2022, for which she had also written, produced and starred as the titular character. For her work, she has won several awards, including a Helpmann Award, AACTA Award, and Asia Pacific Screen Awards Jury Grand Prize.

Purcell is notable for her roles in several television drama series, including Police Rescue (1996), Fallen Angels (1997), Redfern Now (2012–2013), which earned her an AACTA Award, Janet King (2016), and perhaps her most recognisable television role being that of her AACTA and Logie Award-nominated performance as Rita Connors in the Foxtel prison drama series, Wentworth (2018–2021).

Early life and education
Leah Purcell was born on 14 August 1970  in Murgon, Queensland, and she was the youngest of seven children of Aboriginal (Goa–Gunggari–Wakka Wakka Murri) and white Australian descent. Her father was a butcher and a boxing trainer.

After a difficult adolescence looking after her sick mother, Florence, who died while Leah was in her late teens, as well as problems with alcohol and teenage motherhood, Leah left Murgon and moved to Brisbane and became involved with community theatre.

Career
In 1996 she moved to Sydney to become presenter on a music video cable television station, RED Music Channel. This was followed by acting roles in ABC Television series Police Rescue and Fallen Angels.

Together with Scott Rankin she co-wrote and acted in a play called Box the Pony, which played at Sydney's Belvoir Street Theatre, the Sydney Opera House, the 1999 Edinburgh Festival and in 2000 at the Barbican Theatre in London. She then wrote and directed the documentary film Black Chicks Talking, which won a 2002 Inside Film award. She appeared as Claudia in the Australian film Lantana for which role she was nominated for Best Supporting Actress by Sydney-based Film Critics Circle of Australia; she lost to Daniela Farinacci. She appeared on stage in The Vagina Monologues. She went on to appear in three 2004 films, Somersault, The Proposition and Jindabyne, as well as playing the role of Condoleezza Rice in David Hare's play, Stuff Happens in Sydney and Melbourne.

Wentworth
In 2018, Purcell joined the cast of Foxtel drama series Wentworth as Rita Connors, a role originally portrayed by Glenda Linscott in Prisoner. It was announced that she was one of three new leading cast members to join the series for its sixth season, alongside Susie Porter and Rarriwuy Hick. She first appeared in the first episode of season six, broadcast on 19 June 2018. Following her appearances in seasons six and seven, it was announced in October 2018 that she would be reprising her role for the eighth season, which premiered in 2020.

The Drover's Wife
Purcell developed stories in three different media based on the short story by Henry Lawson published in 1892, which Purcell recalls her mother reading to her. She began writing her version of the story in around 2014, giving the woman a name, Molly Johnson, something that Lawson did not do. Purcell's versions centres around Molly, who is left alone on a remote homestead while heavily pregnant and having to care for her four children while her husband is away droving cattle. She meets an Aboriginal man fleeing police, called Yadaka, and a personal drama evolves. She says that "The essence of the Henry Lawson short story and his underlining themes of racism, the frontier violence and gender violence are [in her story]". However, she has added stories from her own Indigenous family as well as incorporating her own extensive historical research, which included talking to Aboriginal elders and owners of property in the Snowy Mountains, where the story is set. She has said of the development of the stories:

She wrote and starred in the play The Drover's Wife, performed at the Belvoir in 2016. The play won multiple awards, including Book of the Year at the NSW Premier's Literary Awards, overall Victorian Prize for Literature at the Victorian Premier's Literary Awards,  two Helpmann Awards, the Major AWGIE Award and several other awards.
She penned a best-selling novel titled The Drover's Wife: The Legend of Molly Johnson, published in 2019. 
Purcell was lead actor, writer, director and co-producer of a film adaptation, also titled The Drover's Wife: The Legend of Molly Johnson, premiered at the South by Southwest Film Festival in March 2021, released on Australian screens on 5 May 2022, after a two-year delay owing to the COVID-19 pandemic. Her husband Bain Stewart is lead producer and executive producer on the film, and Rob Collins plays Yadaka.
In late 2022 it was confirmed that Purcell was writing the follow-up to The Drover's Wife as a series set sometime in the future, with Danny as a adult leading the story.

Recognition, awards and honours
Purcell was recipient of the Balnaves Fellowship in 2014, which allowed her to develop her play, The Drover's Wife, to be performed at the Belvoir in 2016.

In the 2021 Queen's Birthday Honours, Purcell was appointed a Member of the Order of Australia for "significant service to the performing arts, to First Nations youth and culture, and to women".

At the 14th Asia Pacific Screen Awards held in November 2021, she was awarded the Jury Grand Prize for her film The Drover's Wife, "not just for her singular vision in writing, directing, producing and starring in the film but for the journey to bring this remarkable story, viewed through the lens of a First Nations woman to the screen in its entirety".

Purcell has appeared twice on ABC Television's Australian Story, once in 2002 and once in June 2022.

In June 2022, Purcell was honoured with a star on Winton's Walk of Fame, which was unveiled during The Vision Splendid Outback Film Festival.

Personal life
Purcell's partner is Bain Stewart, who is also her business partner in Oombarra Productions. She has a daughter and two grandchildren. She believes that Stewart has been "a gift from the ancestors", as he has been such an important support to her through difficult times.

Filmography

Acting

Other

Awards and nominations

In 2006 Purcell was the recipient of the Bob Maza Fellowship, which recognises emerging acting talent and support professional development for Indigenous actors.

References

External links
 
 
 Leah Purcell on Instagram 

1970 births
20th-century Australian actresses
20th-century Australian dramatists and playwrights
20th-century Australian non-fiction writers
20th-century Australian women writers
21st-century Australian actresses
21st-century Australian dramatists and playwrights
21st-century Australian non-fiction writers
21st-century Australian novelists
21st-century Australian screenwriters
21st-century Australian women writers
AACTA Award winners
Asia Pacific Screen Award winners
Australian documentary filmmakers
Australian film actresses
Australian film directors
Australian historical novelists
Australian music critics
Australian music journalists
Australian social commentators
Australian stage actresses
Australian television actresses
Australian television directors
Australian VJs (media personalities)
Australian women dramatists and playwrights
Australian women film directors
Australian women film producers
Australian women music critics
Australian women novelists
Australian women screenwriters
Australian women television directors
Australian women television presenters
Australian women television writers
Helpmann Award winners
Indigenous Australian actresses
Indigenous Australian filmmakers
Indigenous Australian writers
Living people
Logie Award winners
Members of the Order of Australia
People from Brisbane
People from Queensland
People from Wide Bay–Burnett
Women historical novelists
Women writers about music
Writers about activism and social change
Writers of historical fiction set in the modern age